Andrew Pattison (born 30 January 1949) is a former South African-born Rhodesian and later Zimbabwean tennis player. His career-high ATP singles ranking was world No. 24, which he reached on 24 September 1974. Pattison won four singles tournaments,  and seven doubles tournaments.

Career finals (Open Era)

Singles (4 titles, 7 runner-ups)

Doubles (7 titles, 12 runner-ups)

World Team Tennis
In 1974, Pattison was a member of the World Team Tennis (WTT) champion Denver Racquets. He was named 1974 WTT Playoffs Most Valuable Player.

References

External links
 
 

1949 births
Living people
Zimbabwean people of British descent
White South African people
Sportspeople from Pretoria
Tennis players from Scottsdale, Arizona
Rhodesian male tennis players
South African emigrants to Rhodesia
Tennis people from Arizona
White Zimbabwean sportspeople
Zimbabwean emigrants to the United States
Zimbabwean male tennis players